Sathurukondan is a village situated in the eastern Batticaloa District of Sri Lanka. It lies clos to the regional capital of Batticaloa. Most of its inhabitants are minority Sri Lankan Tamils. 

Villages in Batticaloa District